Doseonsa is a Buddhist temple of the Jogye Order in Seoul, South Korea. It is located at 264 Ui-dong, in the Gangbuk-gu area of the city and is the largest temple complex on Bukhansan, the most prominent mountain north of Seoul. The temple was dedicated in 862, though none of its original structures survive.

See also
List of Buddhist temples in Seoul

External links
www.encyber.com

Buddhist temples in Seoul
Buildings and structures in Gangbuk District
Buddhist temples of the Jogye Order
Religious buildings and structures completed in 862
9th-century establishments in Korea